The Robert Lee Hardy House is a historic house at 207 South Main Street in Monticello, Arkansas.  It was designed for Robert Lee Hardy, a prominent local lawyer, by Knoxville, Tennessee-based architect George Franklin Barber, and built c. 1908–1909, at a time when Monticello was a thriving commercial center.  It is unusual for its construction material (brick), and for its elaborate yet restrained Classical and Colonial Revival styling.

The house was listed on the National Register of Historic Places in 1982.

See also
National Register of Historic Places listings in Drew County, Arkansas

References

Houses on the National Register of Historic Places in Arkansas
Queen Anne architecture in Arkansas
Colonial Revival architecture in Arkansas
Houses completed in 1908
Houses in Drew County, Arkansas
National Register of Historic Places in Drew County, Arkansas
1908 establishments in Arkansas